Tarcisio Burgnich (25 April 1939 – 26 May 2021) was an Italian football manager and player, who played as a defender.

Throughout his career, Burgnich played for Udinese, Juventus, Palermo, Internazionale, and Napoli; although he won titles with both Juventus and Napoli, he is best known for his time with Inter Milan, where he was a member of manager Helenio Herrera's Grande Inter side. He partnered with fellow full-back Giacinto Facchetti in the squad's back-line and played a key role in the team's successes in Herrera's defensive catenaccio system, due to his pace, stamina, offensive capabilities, and defensive work-rate, winning four Serie A titles, two European Cups, and two Intercontinental Cups.

At international level, Burgnich represented the Italy national football team at the 1960 Summer Olympics, where they finished in fourth place, and at three FIFA World Cups, winning a runners-up medal at the 1970 FIFA World Cup. He was also a member of the national team that won Italy's first ever UEFA European Football Championship on home soil, in 1968.

A versatile player, he was capable of playing in any defensive position, being adept as a right-back, as a centre-back, and also as a sweeper. Due to his imposing physique, as well as his tenacious style of play, Inter teammate Armando Picchi (who was the captain and sweeper of the side) gave him the nickname "La Roccia" (The Rock).

Club career
Burgnich began his career with local side Udinese, making his Serie A debut with the club on 2 June 1959, in a 7–0 away defeat to Milan. After short spells at the Friulian side, and subsequently Juventus (where he won the 1960–61 Serie A title), and Palermo, it was with Internazionale that he found his spiritual home in the 1960s, after being acquired in 1962.

A strong, quick, energetic and versatile defender, he was effective both offensively and defensively, and formed a formidable full-back partnership with Giacinto Facchetti, both with Inter and with the Italian national side. He played 467 times for the Nerazzurri, scoring 6 goals, where his physical and tenacious playing style was ideally suited to the catenaccio system operated by Helenio Herrera throughout Inter's glory years, which relied on a strong defence and fast counter-attacks. With Inter, Burgnich enjoyed a highly successful period of domestic, European, and international dominance, winning five Italian championships, two European Cups and two Intercontinental Cups. He was notably part of the legendary Inter lineup of the 1960s still known today as the Grande Inter.

Following his 12 seasons with Inter, he was controversially transferred to Napoli in 1974, as Inter's new president, Fraizzoli, was trying to rejuvenate the squad. Burgnich spent the final three seasons of his career with Napoli, operating as a sweeper in Luís Vinício's side, and finally won the Coppa Italia, as well as the Anglo-Italian League Cup, in 1976, before retiring in 1977. In total, he made 494 appearances in Serie A throughout his career.

International career
Burgnich was also a pillar of the Italian national team for more than a decade. He represented Italy at the 1960 Summer Olympics in Rome, where they finished in fourth place. He made his senior debut on 10 November 1963, in a 1–1 home draw against the Soviet Union, and subsequently became a permanent fixture in the team's line-up, wearing the number 2 shirt, and later helping the national side win their first ever European Football Championship title in 1968, on home soil. He was also on Italy's roster for the 1966 World Cup, as well at the 1970 World Cup, where they reached the final, only to lose 4–1 to Brazil. In the memorable semi-final match against West Germany, often colloquially known as the "Game of the Century", Burgnich even managed to score a goal, helping his team to overcome the Germans 4–3 following extra time. He also took part in the 1974 FIFA World Cup with Italy. In total, he represented the Azzurri 66 times between 1963 and 1974, scoring twice.

He may best be remembered for his quote about Brazilian star Pelé's headed goal against him, following Italy's 4–1 defeat to Brazil in the 1970 World Cup Final (Burgnich had been assigned to man-mark the Brazilian during the final, but was beaten by him in the air):

He later said of the same goal:
"The cross came in and we both leapt as high as we could. Then I came down to Earth where I belong. And he stayed up there, where he belongs, and scored."

After retirement
After his retirement, Burgnich worked as a manager on and off for nearly twenty years, with little success. During this time he managed Catanzaro, Bologna, Como, Livorno, Foggia, Lucchese, Cremonese, Genoa, Ternana and Vicenza.

Burgnich died on 26 May 2021 at the age of 82. He died at the San Camillo hospital in Forte dei Marmi, where he had been taken following a stroke.

Style of play
A strong, large, quick, and energetic player, Burgnich is regarded as one of the greatest Italian defenders of his time; his ability in the air, imposing physique, consistency, and his aggressive yet fair, and efficient playing style earned him the nickname "La Roccia" (The Rock), despite not being particularly tall. A former offensive, central midfielder, he was a tactically versatile, intelligent, and hard-working footballer who was adept at aiding his team both offensively and defensively; he was capable of playing in several defensive positions, and throughout his career, he was deployed as a man-marking centre-back (or "stopper"), as a sweeper (in particular in his later career), and in particular as a right-sided full-back or wing-back, where he particularly excelled in Herrera's catenaccio system, due to his pace, stamina, physicality, and tenacity. He formed an important partnership with the more offensive minded left-back Facchetti during his career, which is regarded as one of the greatest full-back pairings in football history; although he was less adept at starting attacking plays from the back-line than Facchetti, and initially less likely to push forward during his time at Inter, the more defensive minded Burgnich was an "old-fashioned defender", being an excellent man-marker and a hard tackler, who was difficult to beat in one on one situations. He was also known for his anticipation and reactions, as well as his concentration, leadership, and discipline both on and off the pitch, despite his reserved character. However, he was also known for his experience and organisational abilities as a defender, as well as his ability to play the offside trap, and even excelled as an offensive sweeper or central defender at Napoli during his later career in manager Luís Vinício's zonal marking system, where he was also tasked with advancing into midfield to start offensive plays, and to push forward and contribute to his team's attacks, in addition to his defensive duties.

Career statistics

Club

International goals
Scores and results list Italy's goal tally first, score column indicates score after each Burgnich goal.

Honours

Club
Inter
 Serie A: 1962–63, 1964–65, 1965–66, 1970–71
 European Cup: 1964, 1965
 Intercontinental Cup: 1964, 1965

Napoli
 Anglo-Italian Cup: 1976
 Coppa Italia: 1975–76

Juventus
 Serie A: 1960–61

International
Italy
 UEFA European Championship: 1968
 FIFA World Cup Runner-up: 1970

Individual
World Soccer World XI: 1964

References

1939 births
2021 deaths
People from Ruda, Friuli
Italian people of Austrian descent
Italian footballers
Italy international footballers
Udinese Calcio players
Juventus F.C. players
Palermo F.C. players
Inter Milan players
S.S.C. Napoli players
Serie A players
L.R. Vicenza managers
Genoa C.F.C. managers
Serie A managers
1966 FIFA World Cup players
1970 FIFA World Cup players
1974 FIFA World Cup players
Footballers at the 1960 Summer Olympics
Olympic footballers of Italy
UEFA Euro 1968 players
UEFA European Championship-winning players
Italian football managers
Association football defenders
Footballers from Friuli Venezia Giulia
UEFA Champions League winning players
U.S. Catanzaro 1929 managers